Las 30 Cumbias Más Pegadas (Eng.: The 30 Best Cumbias) is the title of a compilation album, which features music from Los Angeles Azules, Los Askis, Rayito Colombiano, Grupo Latino, Grupo Maracuya, Los Llayras, Mr. Chivo, Aniceto Molina, Super Grupo G, La Tropa Vallenata, Los Vallenatos, Yahari, among others. This album peaked at number-one in the Billboard Top Latin Albums chart for one week.

Track listing
The track listing from Billboard.com
Suelta el listón de tu pelo(Angeles Azules) — 2:11
El Afilador (Grupo Carabo) — 3:40
Te Digo Vete (Los Askis)  — 3:10
Conga y timbal (Yaguaru) — 3:39
Amor Carnal (Chon Arauza y La Furia Colombiana) — 2:17
Todo Me Gusta de Ti (Aaron y Su Grupo Ilusion) — 2:22
El Poder de Tu Amor (Grupo Perla Colombiana) — 1:25
Mi Cafetal (Tropa Vallenata) — 1:42
No Me Castigues (Aniceto Molina) — 1:53
Cumbia de los Monjes (Super Grupo G) — 1:14
La Vaca (Yahari) — 1:14
Vuela Mariposa (Llayras) — 1:38
La Planta (Musicalismo Fuego Indio) — 0:57
Lupita (Mister Chivo) — 1:52
Mi Niña Mujer (Angeles Azules) — 1:50
Canto Por No Llorar (Angeles De Leo) — 1:29
Lo Tengo You (Grupo Latino) — 2:38
El Baile del Gavilan (Grupo Maracuya) — 1:28
Perdoname (Chon Arauza y La Furia Colombiana) — 1:30
Conjuro de Amor (Hijos Del Doc) — 1:11
Mentiras (Los Vallenatos De La Cumbia) — 1:29
Sonaja y Tambor (Llamadores de Catagena) — 1:15
El Reloj Cucu (Aaron y Su Grupo Ilusion) — 2:17
Que Se Mueran de Envidia (Hermanos Gutiérrez) — 2:13
Lagrimas de Sangre (Arturo Jaimes y Los Cantantes) — 1:34
La Alberca (Yahari) — 1:24
Se Acabó (Grupo Perla Colombiana) — 1:12
La Bertha (Kañon) — 1:19
El Tao Tao (Aniceto Molina) — 1:08
Mi Banana (J.L.B. y Cia.) — 2:21
El Final De Nuestra Historia (Grupo Quintanna) — 2:21

Chart performance

References

2002 compilation albums
Disa Records compilation albums
Cumbia compilation albums
Spanish-language compilation albums